Bravo TV may refer to:

 Bravo (American TV channel), U.S. cable TV channel owned by NBCUniversal
 Bravo (British TV channel), former British television channel owned by Living TV Group, a subsidiary of British Sky Broadcasting
 Bravo (Canada), Canadian cable TV channel owned by Bell Media
 Bravo (New Zealand), a New Zealand TV channel
 Bravo (Pakistan), a Pakistan TV channels
 Bravo TV (TV series), a German youth television show related to a German youth magazine called Bravo

See also 
 Bravo (disambiguation)